Lucie Milebou Aubusson also known as Lucie Mboussou (born 25 February 1957) is a Gabonese ophthalmologist and politician who has been President of the Senate since 27 February 2015.

Early life and education
Aubusson was born on 25 February 1957 in Fougamou. She has a PhD in Medicine and a Diploma in Ophthalmology from the Aix-Marseille University in France.

Career
Aubusson was the first female ophthalmologist in Gabon. She was the Chief Medical Officer at the Jeanne Ebori Foundation in Libreville from 1988 until 2002 and was an assistant professor at the Faculty of Medicine of Libreville. She was medical director of Medivision Clinic and a founding member of the NGO Gabon Medical Assistance.

Aubusson is a member of the Gabonese Democratic Party and was elected to the senate for the commune of Fougamou in 2002. She was a member of the standing committees on Foreign Affairs, Finance and Regional Planning.

Aubusson has served as President of the National Network of Women Senators of Gabon and Deputy Vice-President of the Gabonese Parliamentary Group. She was Vice President of the Senate during the Third Parliament and became President for its fourth term (2015–2021), succeeding Rose Francine Rogombé.

Awards and honours
 Grand Cross of the Order of the Equatorial Star

Personal life
Aubusson is married to Michel Mboussou, CEO of the National Disease Insurance and Social Guarantee Fund (CNAMGS), and has three children.

References

External links
 Senate Gabon profile

1957 births
Living people
Aix-Marseille University alumni
Gabonese women physicians
Gabonese ophthalmologists
Gabonese Democratic Party politicians
Presidents of the Senate of Gabon
Gabonese women in politics
21st-century Gabonese people